Major General Frederick Clarence Campbell Graham  (14 December 1908 – 9 May 1988) was a senior British Army officer.

Military career
Born the son of Sir (John) Frederick Noble Graham, 2nd Baronet and Irene Maud Campbell, Graham was educated at Eton College and the Royal Military College, Sandhurst. He commissioned into the Argyll and Sutherland Highlanders on 2 February 1929. He served in the Second World War for which he was appointed a Companion of the Distinguished Service Order.

After the war he became commander of the 61st Lorried Infantry Brigade in January 1951, Assistant Commandant of the Royal Military Academy Sandhurst in August 1953 and Deputy Commander of the Land Forces in Hong Kong in 1956. He went on to be General Officer Commanding 51st (Highland) Division in March 1959 before retiring in March 1962.

He served as Colonel of the Argyll and Sutherland Highlanders from 1958 to 1972 and as Lord Lieutenant of Stirling and Falkirk from 1979 to 1983.

Works

Family
In 1936 he married Phyllis Mary MacMahon; they had three sons.

References

External links
British Army Officers 1939−1945

|-

1908 births
1988 deaths
British Army major generals
Argyll and Sutherland Highlanders officers
Companions of the Order of the Bath
Companions of the Distinguished Service Order
People educated at Eton College
Younger sons of baronets
Lord-Lieutenants of Stirling and Falkirk
British Army personnel of World War II